Desert Marauders is an album by American jazz pianist Art Lande and the band Rubisa Patrol recorded in 1977 and released on the ECM label.

Reception
The Allmusic review by Michael G. Nastos awarded the album 3 stars stating "This is solid, contemporary improvisational music, a touch laidback, and makes one wish this ensemble would have carried on. They were special".

Track listing
All compositions by Art Lande except as indicated
 "Rubisa Patrol" - 15:57 
 "Livre (Near the Sky)" (Mark Isham) - 3:54 
 "El Pueblo de Las Vacas Tristes" - 5:50 
 "Perelandra" - 4:29 
 "Sansara" - 8:25
Recorded at the Tonstudio Bauer in Ludwigsburg, West Germany in June 1977

Personnel
Art Lande — piano
Mark Isham — trumpet, flugelhorn
Bill Douglass — bass, flute
Kurt Wortman — drums, percussion

References

ECM Records albums
Art Lande albums
1978 albums
Albums produced by Manfred Eicher